Vietnam is divided into 63 provinces and cities, with 5 cities and 58 provinces. It is a unitary state, so there is no such thing as a state or self-governing provinces.

Administrative units 

Officially, Vietnam is divided into 3 administrative tiers, with different types of administrative unit on each tier:
 First Tier: Municipality (thành phố trực thuộc trung ương) and Province (tỉnh)
 Second Tier: Municipal city (thành phố thuộc thành phố trực thuộc trung ương), Urban district / Borough (quận), Provincial city / City (thành phố thuộc tỉnh), Town (thị xã) and District / County (huyện)
 Third Tier: Ward (phường), Township (thị trấn) and Commune (xã)

A Fourth Tier also exists as Hamlet (xóm, ấp) and Village (làng, thôn, bản). However this is not an official tier.

First Tier

On the First Tier, there are 5 municipalities and 58 provinces

Second Tier

Municipalities are subdivided into: District-level city (Municipal city), Urban District (Borough), District-level town (Town) and District (County). There is no official capital of the municipality but usually the seat of the local authority is located at the central urban district.

Provinces are subdivided into: District-level city (City), District-level town (Town) and District (County). Normally, the Provincial City or Town is the capital of that province.

Based on latest sources of General Statistics Office of Vietnam (GSO), there are 707 Second Tier units.

The Rural District can be upgraded to Town, which can be upgraded to Provincial City.

Third Tier

Urban Districts are subdivided into: Ward, while Towns are subdivided into: Ward and Commune. Rural Districts are subdivided into: Township and Commune.

There is no designated capital for Urban District and Rural District, but usually the seat of the local authority is located at the central ward or township. Similarly, there is no designated capital for Provincial City or Town, but usually the seat of the local authority is located at the central ward.

As of 2020, GSO indicated that there are 10,614 Third Tier units with 1,712 wards, 605 townships and 8,297 communes.

Townships are known as thị trấn in Vietnamese, but less common type of townships are farm townships (thị trấn nông trường).

The Commune can be upgraded to Township or Ward.

Other Subdivisions
Vietnam is also divided into electoral divisions and military regions.

Administrative Regions

Geographically, Socialist Republic of Vietnam is divided into 3 regions but, the Vietnamese government often divides it into 8 administrative regions:

Within each administrative region, they comprises the various First Tier administrative units.

Electoral divisions

For electoral purpose, each province or municipality is divided into electoral units (đơn vị bầu cử) which are further divided into voting zones (khu vực bỏ phiếu). The number of electoral divisions varies from election to election and depends on the population of that province or municipality.

Since the parliamentary election in 2011, there are 183 electoral units and 89,960 voting zones.

Military regions

Vietnam People's Army is organised into 8 military regions:
 High Command of Capital Hanoi (Bộ Tư lệnh Thủ đô Hà Nội) in Ha Noi
 1st Military Region (Vietnam People's Army) (Quân khu 1) in Northeast
 2nd Military Region (Vietnam People's Army) (Quân khu 2) in Northwest
 3rd Military Region (Vietnam People's Army) (Quân khu 3) in Red River Delta
 4th Military Region (Vietnam People's Army) (Quân khu 4) in North Central Coast
 5th Military Region (Vietnam People's Army) (Quân khu 5) in South Central Coast and Central Highland
 7th Military Region (Vietnam People's Army) (Quân khu 7) in Southeast
 9th Military Region (Vietnam People's Army) (Quân khu 9) in Mekong Delta

See also
List of cities in Vietnam

References